The Epsom and Ewell by-election of 27 April 1978 was held after Conservative Member of Parliament (MP) Peter Rawlinson was made a Life peer. The Conservatives held on to the seat in the by-election. Amongst the candidates for the by-election was pop music impresario Jonathan King, who stood as a Royalist candidate.

Results

References

Epsom and Ewell by-election
Epsom and Ewell by-election
By-elections to the Parliament of the United Kingdom in Surrey constituencies
Epsom and Ewell
1970s in Surrey
Epsom and Ewell by-election